Dwight Evans (born May 16, 1954) is an American politician of the Democratic Party serving as the U.S representative for Pennsylvania's 3rd congressional district since 2019. The district, numbered as the 2nd district during his first term, includes most of Center City, West, and Northwest Philadelphia.

Evans defeated incumbent Chaka Fattah in the Democratic primary election, and won a special election on November 8, 2016, following Fattah's resignation from Congress after he faced corruption charges. He previously served in the Pennsylvania House of Representatives, representing the 203rd district.

Early life and education
Evans grew up in the Germantown and West Oak Lane sections of Philadelphia and is a graduate of the Community College of Philadelphia and La Salle University. After graduation, he became a teacher in the School District of Philadelphia and a community activist for the Urban League.

Early political career

Pennsylvania House of Representatives
Evans was first elected to office in 1980. His district, which encompasses West Oak Lane in Philadelphia, was heavily Democratic with a 95% African-American population. He was reelected 12 times against only nominal Republican opposition.

Evans was elected as the Democratic chairman of the House Appropriations Committee in 1990 and served in that capacity until November 2010.

In 2010, the Philadelphia Tribune named Evans one of the 10 most influential African-Americans in the city.

Unsuccessful elections

Before his election to Congress, Evans unsuccessfully ran for higher office four times. In 1986, he sought the Democratic nomination for lieutenant governor, but finished third in the primary election to future Lieutenant Governor Mark Singel.

In 1994, Evans became the first African American candidate to run for governor of Pennsylvania. In the Democratic primary election, he faced Singel and Lynn Yeakel. He was endorsed by The Philadelphia Inquirer, Philadelphia Daily News, and Pittsburgh Post-Gazette. Evans finished second in the primary with 22%.

Evans ran for mayor of Philadelphia twice. In 1999, in the race to succeed Ed Rendell, he finished fifth with 4.7% of the vote in a crowded primary won by John Street. In 2007, despite Rendell's comment that Evans was the "best qualified" for mayor, he finished fifth again, taking only 7.82% of the vote.

U.S. House of Representatives

Elections

2016 special and general

In November 2015, Evans announced that he would run for Pennsylvania's 2nd congressional district in 2016 against Democratic incumbent Chaka Fattah. In an upset, Evans beat Fattah for the Democratic nomination – the real contest in this heavily Democratic, black-majority district – on April 26, 2016. He won mainly by running up his margins in his Olney-Oak Lane stronghold. Fattah resigned two months later amid a corruption scandal.

As a result, Evans ran in two elections on November 8, 2016 – a special election for the balance of Fattah's sixth term, and a regular election for a full two-year term. He won both, and was sworn in on November 14. This gave Evans more seniority than other new members of Congress elected in 2016. His district has been in Democratic hands without interruption since 1949, and has been represented by black congressmen since 1959.

2018 

A court-ordered redistricting ahead of the 2018 elections renumbered Evans's district as the 3rd district. It lost its share of Montgomery County and was pushed slightly further into Philadelphia. Like its predecessor, it is heavily Democratic and majority black. Evans handily defeated Republican challenger Bryan Leib to win his second full term.

2020 
Evans was reelected in 2020 with 91% of the vote, defeating Republican Michael Harvey.

2022 

Evans defeated Alexandra Hunt in the 2022 Democratic primary. No Republicans ran for the seat.

Tenure

In August 2017, following the aftermath of the 2017 Unite the Right rally in Charlottesville, Virginia, Evans and Representative Adriano Espaillat introduced legislation banning Confederate monuments on federal property.

Evans is a member of the Congressional Progressive Caucus and the Congressional Black Caucus.

Issues 
Crime

In September 2018, Evans voted against HR 6691, the Community Safety and Security Act of 2018. The bill would amend the definition of "crime of violence". Within the definition of "crime of violence" is fleeing a police officer in a vehicle or on foot.

In 2021, he voted for the Bipartisan Background Checks Act and the Enhanced Background Checks Act.

In April 2022, Evans announced a $51 billion, seven-point plan to fight gun violence in Philadelphia and around the country. The same month, Giffords PAC endorsed him for reelection.

Environment

On September 24, 2018, Evans was rated 100% by the Clean Water Action group. In 2021, he received 100% on the League of Conservation Voters' National Environmental Scorecard.

Health care

Evans supports three public health option bills in Congress.

Housing

In 2021, Evans announced a $63 billion "Housing Is Essential" plan with Representatives Matt Cartwright and Mike Doyle.

Impeachment of Donald Trump

Evans was an early congressional supporter of impeaching President Donald Trump. He voted for the 2019 and 2021 impeachment resolutions.

Infrastructure

Evans voted for President Joe Biden's infrastructure bill. The legislation includes the $1 billion Reconnecting Communities initiative that he co-led.

Ukraine

In 2022, the Russian government sanctioned Evans along with other congressional supporters of aid to Ukraine.

Committee assignments
Committee on Ways and Means
Committee on Small Business

Caucus memberships
Congressional Progressive Caucus
Congressional Black Caucus

See also
 List of African-American United States representatives

References

External links

 Congressman Dwight Evans official U.S. House website
 Dwight Evans for Congress official campaign website
 

 
 Pennsylvania House of Representatives - Dwight Evans official PA House website (1981-2016)

s

|-

|-

|-

1954 births
20th-century American politicians
21st-century American politicians
African-American members of the United States House of Representatives
African-American state legislators in Pennsylvania
Community College of Philadelphia alumni
Democratic Party members of the United States House of Representatives from Pennsylvania
La Salle University alumni
Living people
Democratic Party members of the Pennsylvania House of Representatives
Politicians from Philadelphia
20th-century African-American politicians
African-American men in politics
21st-century African-American politicians